David McIlwraith is a Canadian actor who has appeared in numerous television series and in several films since the 1970s.

He co-starred in the 1993 television series White Fang and also had a prominent role as Dr. Reginald Murdoch in the 2001 television series Vampire High. He portrayed politician Peter Lougheed in the 2002 mini-series Trudeau. He had a supporting role in the 2005 television film Living With the Enemy. In 2006, he appeared in the feature film Hollow Man II.

Filmography

External links 

Fan page

Living people
Canadian male film actors
Canadian male television actors
Canadian people of Scottish descent
Year of birth missing (living people)